The Salem Civic Center is a 6,820-seat multi-purpose arena in Salem, Virginia. It was built in 1967 and is part of the James E. Taliaferro Sports and Entertainment Complex (named after a former mayor of Salem), which also includes the Salem Football Stadium and the Salem Memorial Baseball Stadium.  The Salem Civic Center was originally known as the Salem-Roanoke Valley Civic Center, but the county withdrew its financial backing in the 1980s.

The civic center was home to the Salem Rebels and Salem Raiders ice hockey teams in the 1960s and 1970s.  The NCAA Division III men's college basketball championship is currently held at the civic center.  Boxing, professional wrestling, rodeos, and high school basketball games are typical events.

In addition to sporting events, the Salem Civic Center also hosts concerts, circuses, conventions and trade shows. The film was used as the location for the national anthem in Borat. The annual Roanoke Valley Horse Show and Salem Fair are held at the civic center and the adjacent grounds.

External links
Official Website

Indoor ice hockey venues in the United States
Convention centers in Virginia
Basketball venues in Virginia
Sports venues in Salem, Virginia
College basketball venues in the United States
Rodeo venues in the United States
1967 establishments in Virginia
Sports venues completed in 1967